In rhetoric, parrhesia is candid speech, speaking freely. It implies not only freedom of speech, but the obligation to speak the truth for the common good, even at personal risk.

Etymology
The earliest recorded use of the term parrhesia is by Euripides in the fifth century B.C. Parrhesia means literally "to speak everything" and by extension "to speak freely", "to speak boldly", or "boldness".

Usage in ancient Greece
In the Classical period, Parrhesia was a fundamental component of the Athenian democracy. In the courts or the Ecclesia, the assembly of citizens, Athenians were free to say almost anything. In the Dionysia, playwrights such as Aristophanes made full use of their right to ridicule whomever they chose. Outside of the theatre or government however, there were limits to what might be said; freedom to discuss politics, morals, religion, or to criticize people would depend upon the context: by whom it was made, and when, and how, and where. If one was seen as immoral, or held views that went contrary to popular opinion, then there were great risks involved in making use of such an unrestricted freedom of speech, such as being charged with impiety (Asebeia). This was the pretext under which Socrates was executed in 399 BCE, for dishonoring the gods and corrupting the young. In actuality, Socrates was more likely punished for his close association with many of the participants in the Athenian coup of 411 BC, because it was widely believed at the time that Socrates' philosophical teachings had served as an intellectual justification for their seizure of power. 

In later Hellenistic philosophy, Parrhesia was a central concept for the Cynic philosophers, as epitomized in the shamelessness of Diogenes of Sinope. According to Philodemus, Parrhesia was also used by the Epicureans in the form of frank criticism of each other that was intended to help the target of criticism achieve the cessation of pain and reach a state of ataraxia.

In the Greek New Testament, parrhesia is the ability of Jesus or his followers to hold their own in discourse before political and religious authorities such as the Pharisees.

Usage in rabbinic Jewish writings
Parrhesia appears in Midrashic literature as a condition for the transmission of Torah. Connoting open and public communication, parrhesia appears in combination with the term δῆμος (dimus, short for dimosia), translated coram publica, in the public eye, i.e. open to the public. As a mode of communication it is repeatedly described in terms analogous to a commons. Parrhesia is closely associated with an ownerless wilderness of primary mytho-geographic import, the Midbar Sinai in which the Torah was initially received. The dissemination of Torah thus depends on its teachers cultivating a nature that is as open, ownerless, and sharing as that wilderness. The term is important to advocates of Open Source Judaism. Here is the text from the Mekhilta where the term dimus parrhesia appears (see bolded text).

Torah was given over dimus parrhesia in a maqom hefker (a place belonging to no one). For had it been given in the Land of Israel, they would have had cause to say to the nations of the world, “you have no share in it.” Thus was it given dimus parrhesia, in a place belonging to no one: “Let all who wish to receive it, come and receive it!”

Explanation: Why was the Torah not given in the land of Israel? In order that the peoples of the world should not have the excuse for saying: `Because it was given in Israel's land, therefore we have not accepted it.

 

Another reason: To avoid causing dissension among the tribes [of Israel]. Else one might have said: In my land the Torah was given. And the other might have said: In my land the Torah was given. Therefore, the Torah was given in the Midbar (wilderness, desert), dimus parrhesia, in a place belonging to no one. To three things the Torah is likened: to the Midbar, to fire, and to water. This is to tell one that just as these three things are free to all who come into the world, so also are the words of the Torah free to all who come into the world.

The term "parrhesia" is also used in Modern Hebrew (usually spelled ), meaning [in] public.

Modern scholarship 
Michel Foucault developed the concept of parrhesia as a mode of discourse in which one speaks openly and truthfully about one's opinions and ideas without the use of rhetoric, manipulation, or generalization. Foucault's use of parrhesia, he tells us, is troubled by our modern day Cartesian model of evidential necessity. For Descartes, truth is the same as the undeniable . Whatever cannot be doubted must be, and, thus, speech that is not examined or criticized does not necessarily have a valid relation to truth.

There are several conditions upon which the traditional Ancient Greek notion of parrhesia relies. One who uses parrhesia is only recognized as doing so if holding a credible relationship to the truth, if one serves as critic to either oneself or popular opinion or culture, if the revelation of this truth places one in a position of danger and one persists in speaking the truth, nevertheless, as one feels it is a moral, social, and/or political obligation. Further, in a public situation, a user of parrhesia must be in a social position less empowered than those to whom this truth is revealed.

Foucault (1983) sums up the Ancient Greek concept of parrhesia as such:

and

Foucault (1984) sums up that:

See also 
Speaking truth to power

References

External links 

 "Discourse and Truth: the Problematization of Parrhesia. (Six lectures given by Michel Foucault at the University of California at Berkeley, Oct-Nov. 1983)" (PDF)
 "Aphasia+Parrhesia: Code and Speech in the Neural Topographies of the Net". Christina McPhee (2003).
 
 

Rhetoric
Cynicism
Michel Foucault